John Theophilus Oti Ankrah (25 December 1925 – 28 May 1995), better known as Roy Ankrah, was a Ghanaian featherweight boxing contender during the 1950s. He was given the nicknames "The Black Flash" and "Mr. Perpetual Motion" because of his fast hands and crafty footwork. Ankrah held the Commonwealth featherweight title from 1951 to 1952 and had his biggest fight against then-reigning NBA, NYSAC, and The Ring bantamweight world champion in a non-title fight as both fighters weighed above the  limit for a bantamweight fighter.

Early life 
According to some sources, Roy Ankrah was born in Jamestown, Ghana in 1923; however other sources have listed him as being born in 1925. His aunt raised Ankrah after the death of his mother. He soon became known as a street fighter and won the regional school championship at the age of 12. By this time, Ankrah was already working as a mechanic in his uncle's auto repair shop. He won his first professional fight at the age of 17.

Career
After winning the national featherweight title in 1941, he joined the army.  During his time with the Armed Forces, he was sent to India during World War II, where he is said to have participated in numerous exhibition fights and championships. After his return from India, the Ghanaian fighter began training for the national featherweight title once again. During this time, he defeated Nigerian stoker Kid Parry, claiming the title of West African champion. He is said to have kept this undefeated status until he moved to the British Isles.

According to reports, Ankrah switched to the professional camp on the Gold Coast in 1941. He was undefeated throughout his 110 fights until 1949. During this period, he became the national champion in five different weight classes; flyweight, bantamweight, featherweight, lightweight and welterweight. Following a suggestion by his fellow fighter Freddie Mills, Ankrah made his debut as the first Ghanaian to fight overseas. On February 8, 1950, he joined George Lamont in the ring in Paisley, Scotland. He went on record as having 10 further wins before eventually losing to Jimmy Murray on a foul on May 30, 1950. On April 30, 1951, Ankrah won the Commonwealth featherweight title against Ronnie Clayton.  He maintained this title until October 2, 1954, when he lost to Billy Kelly. Shortly thereafter, Ankrah took a break and stopped competing in the British Isles. However, in 1959, he traveled back to his native Ghana, where he competed in three more professional fights, losing two. He later supported the Ghanaian National Team in preparation for the Commonwealth and Olympic Games. He assisted the British trainer Jack Roy at the 1960 Olympic Games when Clement Quartey won the first Olympic medal for the former British colony. After these games, Ankrah was promoted to National Coach and worked directly with the National Sports Council until 1994, in addition to being a judge for the World Boxing Council (WBC).

Professional boxing record

References

External links

Image - Roy Ankrah

1925 births
1995 deaths
Featherweight boxers
Lightweight boxers
Place of birth missing
Super-featherweight boxers
Ghanaian male boxers